, also written as 2011 UN63,  is a Mars trojan, an asteroid orbiting near the  of Mars (60 degrees behind Mars on its orbit).

Discovery, orbit and physical properties
 was first observed on 27 September 2009 by the Mt. Lemmon Survey and given the provisional designation . Lost, it was re-discovered on 21 October 2011 again by the Mt. Lemmon Survey.  follows a low eccentricity orbit (0.064) with a semi-major axis of 1.52 AU. This object has moderate orbital inclination (20.4°). It was classified as Mars-crosser by the Minor Planet Center upon discovery. Its orbit is relatively well determined as it is currently (March 2013) based on 64 observations with a data-arc span of 793 days. This asteroid has an absolute magnitude of 19.7 which gives a characteristic diameter of 560 m.

Mars trojan and orbital evolution
Recent calculations indicate that it is a stable  Mars trojan asteroid with a libration
period of 1350 yr and an amplitude of 14°.

Origin
Long-term numerical integrations show that its orbit is very stable on Gyr time-scales (1 Gyr = 1 billion years). As in the case of Eureka, calculations in both directions of time (4.5 Gyr into the past and 4.5 Gyr into the future) indicate that  may be a primordial object, perhaps a survivor of the planetesimal population that formed in the terrestrial planets region early in the history of the Solar System.

See also 
 5261 Eureka (1990 MB)

References 

Further reading
Three new stable L5 Mars Trojans de la Fuente Marcos, C., de la Fuente Marcos, R. 2013, Monthly Notices of the Royal Astronomical Society: Letters, Vol. 432, Issue 1, pp. 31–35.
Orbital clustering of Martian Trojans: An asteroid family in the inner solar system? Christou, A. A. 2013, Icarus, Vol. 224, Issue 1, pp. 144–153.

External links 
  data at MPC
  data at AstDyS-2.
 

Mars trojans

Minor planet object articles (unnumbered)
20090927
20111021